Robert Dobbie (1901–2000) was a Pastor hailing from Dundee, Scotland who taught Old Testament at the Universities of Glasgow (1946–1947), St. Andrews (1947–1955), Toronto (1955–1969) and at Carleton (1969–1974).

Robert Dobbie was active in contributing to Old Testament scholarship.  Wolfgang Roth was a student of Dobbie at Toronto.  Dobbie also used to compose hymns.

Dobbie was a member of the Society of Biblical Literature and was at one time elected as Vice-President of the Canadian section of Society of Biblical Literature.  Dobbie used to contribute to Old Testament scholarship through his writings which appeared in biblical journals like The Expository Times, Vetus Testamentum, Canadian Journal of Theology, Scottish Journal of Theology, International Review of Missions.

Dobbie last taught at the Carleton University where he was Visiting Professor of Religion from 1969 onwards.

Hymns
 Eternal Father, Lord of space and time
 Eternal God, we consecrate these children

Writings
1955, The Text of Hosea Ix 8
1958, Sacrifice and Morality in the Old Testament
1958, Jeremiah and the preacher
1958, A Meditation on Jonah
1959, Deuteronomy and the prophetic attitude to sacrifice 
1962, The Biblical Foundation of the Mission of the Church.  I: The Old Testament

Achievements
The Senate of the Victoria University in the University of Toronto conferred an honorary degree of Doctor of Divinity by Honoris Causa upon Dobbie in 1979.

References
Notes

Further reading
 

1901 births
2000 deaths
People from Dundee
Alumni of the University of Glasgow
Old Testament scholars
Academic staff of the University of Victoria
Scottish Congregationalist ministers
20th-century Congregationalist ministers